The Atlantic Hotel is a former hotel in Spanish Point, County Clare, Ireland. It was built around 1810 by Thomas Moroney, a member of the family of local landlords. For quite a while it boasted the title "Biggest Hotel on the British Isles".

History
In ca, 1845, Thomas Moroney extended the hotel to sixty rooms with luxurious hot and cold baths and spacious halls. The quietness and luxury made it a popular refuge for Irish and English gentry.

After a nine-hole golf course was established at Spanish Point, they soon started a collaboration. Guests of the hotel could play for free, others had to pay a green fee of 2 shillings 6 pence.

Auxiliary workhouse 
In 1838, the British Government issued the Irish Poor Laws to take care of the poor people and, in emergencies, to take control over destitute people. After the outbreak of the potato blight (Phytophthora infestans) and the failure of the potato crops, the system almost cracked under the pressure. Spanish Point fell under the Poor Law Union of Ennistymon. The Poor Law Union had set up a workhouse between Ennistymon and Lahinch. When the real trouble broke out due to the famine, the workhouse was soon overwhelmed. The Poor Law Union leased several other big buildings to serve as auxiliary workhouses. The Atlantic Hotel was one of them, and from September 1848 it housed 500 women and children.

In 1893, the hotel was owned by Mrs. E.L. Moroney.

Leon XIII
The hotel also played a part in the story of the 1907 rescue of the French three-masted ship Leon XIII. During a very severe storm the vessel ran on a reef near Quilty. Despite the extreme danger of storm and heavy sea, the fishermen from Quilty manned their currachs and came to the rescue. Over three days they managed to save most of the crew members, except the captain. With a broken leg he could not be moved. He was rescued later, after the storm, by a naval vessel.

The French Government was very impressed. At an event in the Atlantic Hotel, the Government presented the gallant fishermen with bronze medals.

Closing down
In 1930, the hotel was permanently closed. It had largely depended on the English gentry but they did not dare to travel to Spanish Point after the Irish War of Independence and the Civil War. The building was still mentioned in the 1942 ITA Survey, but not as a hotel.

After the closure of the hotel, the site eventually became derelict. Nowadays, just a few pieces are left.

Armada Hotel
In the 1970s a new hotel, the 85-room Armada Hotel, was built on the site.

References

Hotels in County Clare
Defunct hotels